Stringtown can refer to the following:

Places
United States
Stringtown, Boone County, Indiana
Stringtown, Fountain County, Indiana
Stringtown, Hancock County, Indiana
Stringtown, Miami County, Indiana
Stringtown, Ripley County, Indiana
Stringtown, Sullivan County, Indiana
Stringtown, Vanderburgh County, Indiana
Stringtown, Butler County, Missouri
Stringtown, Cole County, Missouri
Stringtown, Greene County, Ohio
Stringtown, Pickaway County, Ohio
Stringtown, Oklahoma
Stringtown, Pennsylvania
Stringtown, Virginia (disambiguation)
Stringtown, Barbour County, West Virginia
Stringtown, Marion County, West Virginia
Stringtown, Roane County, West Virginia
Stringtown, Tyler County, West Virginia
Fern Creek, Louisville, an area originally called Stringtown

Music
Stringtown (album), a limited-edition live album from acoustic rock band Jars of Clay